Christiane Mora (14 November 1938 – 11 October 2017) was a French politician who served on the National Assembly for three terms, from 1981 to 1992 as a representative of Indre-et-Loire. Between 1989 and 1995, she was mayor of Loches.

Mora died on 11 October 2017, aged 78.

References

1938 births
2017 deaths
Women mayors of places in France
Women members of the National Assembly (France)
20th-century French historians
French women historians
20th-century French women writers
People from Loches